Psettopsis subarcuatus is an extinct, prehistoric moonyfish that lived during the Lutetian epoch of Monte Bolca, Italy.

It had large, rounded dorsal and anal fins, and was a comparatively large fish, being about 45 centimeters long, much larger than its relative, Pasaichthys.

See also

 Pasaichthys
 Prehistoric fish
 List of prehistoric bony fish

References

Eocene fish
Monodactylidae
Fossils of Italy
Prehistoric ray-finned fish genera